Condofuri is a comune (municipality) in the Province of Reggio Calabria in the Italian region Calabria, located about  southwest of Catanzaro and about  southeast of Reggio Calabria.

Condofuri borders the following municipalities: Bova, Bova Marina, Roccaforte del Greco, Roghudi, San Lorenzo.

References

External links
 Official website

Cities and towns in Calabria